In functional analysis, a topological vector space (TVS) is said to be countably quasi-barrelled if every strongly bounded countable union of equicontinuous subsets of its continuous dual space is again equicontinuous. 
This property is a generalization of quasibarrelled spaces.

Definition 

A Hausdorff locally convex TVS is countably quasi-barrelled if and only if each bornivorous barrel in X that is equal to the countable intersection of closed convex balanced neighborhoods of 0 is itself a neighborhood of 0.

σ-quasi-barrelled space 

Sequentially quasi-barrelled space 

Properties 

Every countably quasi-barrelled space is a σ-quasi-barrelled space.

Examples and sufficient conditions 

Every barrelled space, every countably barrelled space, and every quasi-barrelled space is countably quasi-barrelled and thus also σ-quasi-barrelled space. 
The strong dual of a distinguished space and of a metrizable locally convex space is countably quasi-barrelled.

Every σ-barrelled space is a σ-quasi-barrelled space. 
Every DF-space is countably quasi-barrelled. 
A σ-quasi-barrelled space that is sequentially complete is a σ-barrelled space. 

There exist σ-barrelled spaces that are not Mackey spaces. 
There exist σ-barrelled spaces (which are consequently σ-quasi-barrelled spaces) that are not countably quasi-barrelled spaces. 
There exist sequentially complete Mackey spaces that are not σ-quasi-barrelled.
There exist sequentially barrelled spaces that are not σ-quasi-barrelled. 
There exist quasi-complete locally convex TVSs that are not sequentially barrelled.

See also 

 Barrelled space
 Countably barrelled space
 DF-space
 H-space
 Quasibarrelled space

References

  
  
  
  
 

Functional analysis